Letty Cottin Pogrebin (born June 9, 1939) is an American author, journalist, lecturer, and social activist. She is a founding editor of Ms. magazine, the author of twelve books, and was an editorial consultant for the TV special Free to Be... You and Me (as well as for the album and book associated with it) for which she earned an Emmy.

Early life and education
Loretta (nickname, "Letty") Cottin was born to a Conservative Jewish family in Queens, the daughter of Cyral (née Halpern) and Jacob Cottin. Her father was a lawyer who was active in the Jewish community and her mother was a designer. She attended the Yeshiva of Central Queens and the Jamaica Jewish Center Hebrew High School. After graduating from Jamaica High School in Jamaica, Queens, New York City, she earned a bachelor's degree from Brandeis University in English and American literature in 1959.

Career
She was a founding editor of Ms. Magazine and a cofounder of Ms. Foundation for Women and the National Women's Political Caucus.

From 1960 to 1970, she worked for the publishing company Bernard Geis Associates as their director of publicity and later their vice president. From 1970 to 1980, she  wrote a column for Ladies' Home Journal called "The Working Woman." 

In 1976, Pogrebin was among 13 women who attended a feminist Passover Seder, the first organized and led by Esther M. Broner in her New York City apartment.

in 1977, Pogrebin became an associate of the Women's Institute for Freedom of the Press (WIFP). WIFP is an American nonprofit publishing organization. The organization works to increase communication between women and connect the public with forms of women-based media.

In 1979, the Supersisters trading card set was produced and distributed; one of the cards featured Pogrebin's name and picture.

She authored How to Be a Friend to a Friend Who's Sick, a guide, after she was diagnosed with breast cancer in 2009.

She was featured (among others) in the 2013 documentary film Makers: Women Who Make America.

Pogrebin is a life member of Hadassah, and in 2013 was awarded that year's Myrtle Wreath Award from Hadassah's Southern New Jersey Region.

She is a board member of (among other organizations) the Director's Council of the Women in Religion Program at the Harvard Divinity School, the Ms. Foundation for Education and Communication, and the Women's, Gender, and Sexuality Studies Program at Brandeis University.

Personal life
With management-side labor lawyer Bert Pogrebin, a partner at Littler Mendelson, she is the mother of identical twin daughters, Robin Pogrebin and Abigail Pogrebin, and a son, David. She is the grandmother of six.

Books
 How to Make It in a Man's World (1970)
 Free to Be You and Me (1972) (consulting editor)
 Getting Yours: How to Make the System Work for the Working Woman (1976)
 Growing Up Free: Raising Your Child in the 80s (1980)
 Stories for Free Children (1982) (editor)
 Family Politics: Love and Power on an Intimate Frontier (1983)
 Free to Be...A Family (1987) (consulting editor)
 Among Friends: Who We Like, Why We Like Them and What We Do with Them (1988)
 Deborah, Golda, and Me: Being Female and Jewish in America (1991)
 Getting Over Getting Older: An Intimate Journey (1996)
 Three Daughters (2003)
 How to Be a Friend to a Friend Who's Sick (2013)
 Single Jewish Male Seeking Soulmate (2015)
 Shanda: A Memoir of Shame and Secrecy (2022)

References

Further reading
 "Pogrebin, Letty Cottin," in Current Biography Yearbook (1997)
 "Letty Cottin Pogrebin," in Jewish Women in America (1997), by S. Weidman Schneider, with P.E. Hyman and D.D. Moore (ed.), vol. 2, 1087–89

External links

 Letty Cottin Pogrebin papers at the Sophia Smith Collection, Smith College Special Collections

1939 births
American feminists
American non-fiction writers
American women journalists
American women's rights activists
Brandeis University alumni
Emmy Award winners 
Jewish American journalists
Jewish feminists
Living people